Miriam Sophie Freud (August 6, 1924 – June 3, 2022) was an Austrian American psychosociologist, educator, and author. The granddaughter of Sigmund Freud, she was a critic of psychoanalysis, aspects of which she described as "narcissistic indulgence". Her criticisms of the elder Freud's psychoanalytical doctrines made her the "black sheep" of the family and she observed how all of her female relatives, including her mother, Ernestine, and aunt Anna, were adversely affected by Sigmund's claims about women and their internal experiences.

Early life and education 
Freud was born in Vienna, Austria, and was raised in what her mother,  (1896–1980), a speech therapist, referred to as an upper class Jewish ghetto. Her father, lawyer Jean Martin Freud (1889–1967), was the eldest son of Sigmund Freud. He later became the director of Freud’s Psychoanalytic Publishing House. Sophie had one elder brother, Walter (1921–2004).

Freud fled Vienna in 1938 after the Anschluss.  From 1942, she lived in Boston and attended Radcliffe College, receiving her bachelor's degree in 1946. Subsequent studies at Simmons University School of Social Work  led to a master's degree in 1948. Freud was awarded a doctoral degree from Brandeis University in 1970.

Career 
Freud then taught at Simmons College, along with taking time to teach social work in Canada and across countries in Europe. She went on to write a book entitled Living in the Shadow of the Freud Family for her mother, which was released in Germany as In the Shadow of the Freud Family: My Mother Experiences the 20th Century. She also wrote My Three Mothers and Other Passions. She appeared in the 2003 film Neighbours: Freud and Hitler in Vienna, in which she stated: "In my eyes, both Adolf Hitler and my grandfather were false prophets of the twentieth century."

Freud served as the book review editor for the American Journal of Psychotherapy.

Research 
A primary focus of Freud's life's research alongside her social work activities was on re-investigating the work of her grandfather regarding women and narcissism. In the 1970s, she conducted surveys of women on their "passions" and the things they felt strongly about, showing that Sigmund Freud was incorrect in his claim that only men have "true passion".

Personal life 
Freud was the last surviving granddaughter of Sigmund Freud, who she visited regularly on Sundays when she was a child. She was a feminist who pushed for women's rights in academia and fought against the presumption that a woman who became pregnant would be unable to continue with education or, in her case, professional social work activities.

Freud married Paul Loewenstein (1921–1992) in 1945; the couple had three children. They divorced in 1985 and Freud reverted to using her maiden name. On June 3, 2022, Freud died of pancreatic cancer at her home in Lincoln, Massachusetts.

Bibliography

References 

1924 births
2022 deaths
20th-century American psychologists
21st-century American psychologists
American people of Austrian-Jewish descent
American women psychologists
Austrian emigrants to the United States
Deaths from cancer in Massachusetts
Deaths from pancreatic cancer
Sophie
Jewish psychologists
People from Vienna
Radcliffe College alumni
Simmons University alumni
Simmons University faculty